Vexillum citrinum, common name : the Queen Mitre,  is a species of small sea snail, marine gastropod mollusk in the family Costellariidae, the ribbed miters.

Description

The shell size varies between 50 mm and 86 mm.

The smooth shell is ovately conical, rounded and rather solid at the upper part. The spire is short, finely striated towards the apex. The apex is raised and sharp. The shell has as orange citron colour, variously stained with livid chesnut. The columella is five-plaited. The aperture is very long.

Distribution
This species occurs in the Indian Ocean off East Africa, Madagascar and in the Western Pacific.

References

 Dautzenberg, Ph. (1929). Mollusques testacés marins de Madagascar. Faune des Colonies Francaises, Tome III
 Steyn, D. G.; Lussi, M. (2005). Offshore Shells of Southern Africa: A pictorial guide to more than 750 Gastropods. Published by the authors. pp. i–vi, 1–289.
 Turner H. 2001. Katalog der Familie Costellariidae Macdonald, 1860. Conchbooks. 1-100 page(s): 24
 Herrmann, M. and E. Guillot de Suduiraut. 2009. Two new species of Vexillum from the Philippines and Malaysia with remarks on Vexillum plicarium (Linnaeus, 1758), its synonyms and the identity of Vexillum citrinum (Gmelin, 1791)(Gastropoda: Costellariidae). Conchylia 40(3-4): 26-33

External links
 
 Gmelin, J. F. (1791). Vermes. In: Gmelin J.F. (Ed.) Caroli a Linnaei Systema Naturae per Regna Tria Naturae, Ed. 13. Tome 1(6). G.E. Beer, Lipsiae
 Sowerby, G. B. II. (1874). Monograph of the genus Mitra. In G. B. Sowerby II (ed.), Thesaurus conchyliorum, or monographs of genera of shells. Vol. 4 (31-32): 1–46, pls 352–379. London, privately published

citrinum
Gastropods described in 1791